Smoots Creek is a stream in Kingman and Reno counties, Kansas, in the United States.

Smoots Creek was named for Col. S. S. Smoot, a government surveyor.

See also
List of rivers of Kansas

References

Rivers of Kingman County, Kansas
Rivers of Reno County, Kansas
Rivers of Kansas